City of Thieves is the third full-length album released by Manchester, UK-based Sonic Boom Six, and the fifth record to be released on their own Rebel Alliance Recordings. Whilst SB6's eclectic punk soundclash staunchly remains far too down-to-earth to ever being described as 'prog', the album follows the concept of a collection of songs that explore and examine life in a large UK city.

Track listing
(Welcome To) The City Of Thieves - 2:42
Back 2 Skool - 3:33
The Road To Hell Is Paved With Good Inventions - 3:40
Bang! Bang! Bang! Bang! - 3:59
A Bright Cold Day In April - 2:43
Rum Little Skallywag - 2:42
The Concrete We're Trapped Within (It's Yours) - 3:56
Strange Transformations - 3:56
Through The Eyes Of A Child - 3:49
Polished Chrome And Open Kitchens - 4:31
Jericho - 3:35
Floating Away - 5:27

2011 UK CD version
Nine Stitches
The Dangers of Rock n Roll
This is Real
Bang! Bang! Bang! Bang! [Midas Mix]

References

External links
Sonic Boom Six online store

Sonic Boom Six albums